Kuksu, was a religion in Northern California practiced by members within several Indigenous peoples of California before and during contact with the arriving European settlers. The religious belief system was held by several tribes in Central California and Northern California, from the Sacramento Valley west to the Pacific Ocean.

The practice of Kuksu religion included elaborate narrative ceremonial dances and specific regalia. The men of the tribe practiced rituals to ensure good health, bountiful harvests, hunts, fertility, and good weather. Ceremonies included an annual mourning ceremony, rites of passage, and intervention with the spirit world. A male secret society met in underground dance rooms and danced in disguises at the public dances.

Among the Patwin and Maidu, Hesi developed as a subdivision of Kuksu distinguished by its female participation.

Kuksu has been identified archaeologically by the discovery of underground dance rooms and wooden dance drums.

Northern Kuksu religion

Patwin
The Patwin culture of Northern California had comparatively strong and noticeable Kuksu systems and rituals.

Maidu
The Maidu culture of Northern California had comparatively strong and noticeable Kuksu systems and rituals.

Pomo

Kuksu was personified as a spirit being by the Pomo people. Their mythology and dance ceremonies were witnessed, including the spirit of Kuksu or Guksu, between 1892 and 1904. The Pomo used the name Kuksu or  Guksu, depending on the dialect, as the name for a red-beaked supernatural being, that lived in a sweathouse at the southern end of the world. Healing was his province and specialty. The person who played the Kuksu/Guksu in Pomo dance ceremonies was often considered the medicine man, and dressed as him when attending the sick. A ceremony dance was named after him. He also appeared in costume at most ceremonies briefly in order to take away the villager's illnesses.

All males were expected to join a ceremonial society; some of their dances were private or secret from women and children.  Scholars differ in their opinions of the societies' power in the tribe: "There was no secret society of importance as there was among the Maidu and presumedly among the neighboring Wintun, and no organized priesthood vested with control over ceremonies." In contrast, in 1925 a witness of the Clear Lake Pomo said: "The heart of religious activities lay in a secret society called kuhma, akin to that of the Patwin and Maidu and composed chiefly of men, which managed the ritual of the ancient kuksu religion.

Southern Kuksu religion
The ethnohistorian Alfred L. Kroeber observed that Kuksu existed, but had less "specialized cosmogony," in the "southern Kuksu-dancing groups" of the Ohlone/Costanoan, Salinan, Miwok and Esselen and northernmost Yokuts, in comparison to the groups in the Northern California and northern Sacramento Valley.

Notes

References
 Barret, Samuel A. "Ceremonies of the Pomo Indians", Published by University of California Publications in American Archaeology and Ethnicity, July 6, 1917, Vol. 12, No 10., pages 397-441. Thi Stephen Powers.
 Kroeber, Alfred L. The Kuksu Cult. Paraphrased. Maidu Culture 
 Kroeber, Alfred L. 1907. The Religion of the Indians of California, University of California Publications in American Archaeology and Ethnology 4:#6. Berkeley, sections titled "Shamanism", "Public Ceremonies", "Ceremonial Structures and Paraphernalia", and "Mythology and Beliefs"; available at Sacred Texts Online
 Kroeber, Alfred L. 1925. Handbook of the Indians of California. Washington, D.C: Bureau of American Ethnology Bulletin No. 78; (Miwok chapter is available at Yosemite Online Library - discusses Kuksu)
 Gifford, Edward W. 1926. Clear Lake Pomo Society,University of California Publications in American Archaeology and Ethnology 18:2 p. 353-363 "Secret Society Members" (Describes E.M. Loeb's 1925 investigation of the Clear Lake Pomo's practice of the Guksu [sic] religion.)

See also
 Native Americans in California
 Traditional narratives (Native California)

Maidu
Ohlone
Pomo tribe
Patwin
Yokuts
Native American religion
Native American mythology of California
Native American history of California
Miwok